The 2011 Cupa României Final was the 11th final of the Cupa României between the archrivals Dinamo București and Steaua București. The match took place on 25 May 2011 at the Silviu Ploeşteanu stadium in Brașov. Steaua won the 21st cup in the club's history after beating Dinamo 2–1.

Pre-match

Opening ceremony
Start of the match was given by the winner fan of "Drumul Mingii" (The Road of the Ball), including Romanian football legends like Ilie Balaci, Adrian Bumbescu, Rodion Cămătaru and Sorin Cârțu.

Route to the final

Match

Details

References

External links
 Official site 

2011
Cupa
2011
FC Steaua București matches